The Azerbaijani records in swimming are the fastest ever performances of swimmers from Azerbaijan, which are recognised and ratified by the Azerbaijan Swimming Federation (ASF).

All records were set in finals unless noted otherwise.

Long Course (50 m)

Men

Women

Short Course (25 m)

Men

Women

References

External links
 ASF web site

Azerbaijan
Records
Swimming
Swimming